Various schools and universities serve Tokyo, Japan.

Primary and secondary schools 

Publicly run kindergartens, elementary schools (years 1 through 6), and junior high schools (7 through 9) are operated by local wards or municipal offices. Public high schools in Tokyo are run by the Tokyo Metropolitan Government Board of Education and are called "Metropolitan High Schools". Tokyo also has many private schools from kindergarten through high school.

Colleges and universities 
The capital of Japan, Tokyo is home to many public and private universities, including the University of Tokyo, the most prestigious college in Japan.

Ranking 

Various groups rank colleges and universities worldwide. See College and university rankings.

In 2016 The Times Higher Education Supplement ranked the University of Tokyo at 13th in Asia, the highest among universities in Japan. Tokyo Institute of Technology was at 14th place, Waseda was at 41st and Keio at 42nd and Tokyo University of Science at 114th. Tokyo Metropolitan University (119), Chiba University (123) follow.

According to the Institute of Higher Education, Shanghai Jiao Tong, the top-ranked private universities in Tokyo were Keio (ranked in the 301–400 group), and Tokyo University of Science (ranked in the 401–500 group).

According to Times Higher Education "ranking of CEOs of major global enterprises", the top-ranked private universities in Tokyo were Tokyo University of Science (28th place), Waseda (48th place), and Keio (53rd place).

According to nature INDEX, the top-ranked private universities in Tokyo were Keio (12th place), Waseda (19th place), and Tokyo University of Science (27th place).

In 2008, The École des Mines de Paris ranks Keio 4th globally.

The École des Mines de Paris list of "The 377 leading higher education institutions in 2009" is "based on Fortune Global 500, 2008" and puts the University of Tokyo first in the world, Waseda 4th, Keio joint 11th, Chuo joint 20th, and Hitotsubashi joint 42nd.

The 4ICU ranking classifies Keio as the 1st top university in Japan, based on web popularity ranking. Also in the top 20 are (in 2010)

Tokyo (#2), Waseda (#3), Tokyo Institute of Technology (#6), Nihon (#10), Meiji (#11), Hosei (#14), Tokai (#19), Chuo (#20).

Webometrics ranks University of Tokyo as first in Asia for quantity and quality of web publication, and Keio seventh.

Within Tokyo, the relative degree of difficulty of entrance to particular "Faculties" (gakubu, also called "Schools") or even their component Departments is of some interest. Yoyogi Seminar, a large cram school company, publishes lists of gakubu arranged by difficulty. For faculties of law, economics, business and commerce of public universities, the most demanding in or for 2010 was Hitotsubashi University's faculty of law, followed by faculties of the University of Tokyo; for these subjects at private universities, four faculties of Keio and two of Waseda outclassed their closest rivals (at Sophia and Chuo); for faculties of humanities, education, languages and social studies of public universities, Tokyo, the Tokyo University of Foreign Studies, Hitotsubashi, and Ochanomizu were particularly demanding; for the same at private universities, two faculties of Keio, four of Waseda, one of Sophia and one of Hosei occupied the top two ranks.

See also 

 Education in Japan

References

The EMP Professional Ranking of World Universities (retrieved December 16, 2007)
Institute of Higher Education, Shanghai Jiao Tong (retrieved December 16, 2007)
Webometrics (retrieved December 16, 2007)
QS Top Universities: Top 400 universities in the THES - QS World University Rankings 2007 (retrieved December 16, 2007)

Further reading
College Quality and Earnings in the Japanese Labor Market. Hiroshi Ono. SSE/EFI Working Paper Series in Economics and Finance No 395 (Revised March 11, 2003).
Educational Credentials and Promotion Chances in Japanese and American Organizations. Hiroshi Ishida, Seymour Spilerman & Kuo-Hsien Su. American Sociological Review, Vol 62, No 6 (Dec., 1997), pp. 866–882.
"Gakureki shakai kasetsu no kento" (Examining the educational credentialism hypothesis). Bunshiro Ando. In Kenichi Tominaga, ed., Nihon no Kaiso Kozo (1994) University of Tokyo Press, pp. 275–292.
A Review of Higher Education Reform in Modern Japan. Paul Doyon. Higher Education, Vol. 41, No. 4 (Jun., 2001), pp. 443–470.
Japan's Top 30 Universities. William Currie. International Higher Education, Winter 2002 
Engineering Tasks for the New Century: Japanese and U.S. Perspectives (1999) Office of International Affairs 
www.yozemi.ac.jp/rank/gakubu/
www.toshin.com/daigakuranking/